Events in the year 1887 in Portugal.

Incumbents
Monarch: Louis I
Prime Minister: José Luciano de Castro

Events
6 March – Portuguese legislative election, 1887
1 December – Signing of the Sino-Portuguese Treaty of Peking, when sovereignty over Macau was surrendered to Portugal, or as in the Chinese interpretation, only administrative rights were transferred

Arts and entertainment

Sports

Births

7 March – Cyril Wright (rugby union), rugby player (died 1960)
21 March – Luís Filipe, Prince Royal of Portugal, prince (died 1908)
17 May – Froilano de Mello, microbiologist (died 1955)
14 November – Amadeo de Souza Cardoso, painter (died 1918)
18 December – Artur Carlos de Barros Basto, military officer (died 1961)

Deaths

19 October – José Rodrigues, painter (born 1828)
11 November – Manuel Inocêncio Liberato dos Santos, musician (born 1802).

Full date unknown
Fontes Pereira de Melo, statesman, politician, and engineer (born 1819)

References

 
1880s in Portugal
Portugal
Years of the 19th century in Portugal
Portugal